Big Lick Township is one of ten townships in Stanly County, North Carolina, United States. In the 2010 census, it had a population of 5,125.

References

Townships in Stanly County, North Carolina
Townships in North Carolina